Bali is an island province of Indonesia.

Bali may also refer to:

Places

Africa 
 Bali, Cameroon, a city in West Africa
 Bali, Ethiopia, a region in south-eastern Ethiopia
 Bali, Nigeria, a Local Government Area in Taraba State

Asia 
 Balahi, a village in Kermanshah Province, Iran, also known as Bali
 Bali, Bhutan, a village
 Bali, Lanzhou, a town of Lanzhou, China
 Bali District, a district of New Taipei City in the Republic of China (Taiwan)
 Bali, Rajasthan, a city in the Indian state of Rajasthan
 Bali (Rajasthan Assembly constituency), the state assembly constituency comprising the city
 Bali Sea, north of the island of Bali
 Bali Strait, between the Indonesian islands of Bali and Java
 Bali, Baghpat district, a village in the Indian state of Uttar Pradesh
 Bali, West New Britain, alternative name for Unea or Uneapa island on West New Britain, Papua New Guinea
 Berimvand, Sarpol-e Zahab, a village in Kermanshah Province, Iran, also known as Bali
 Bali Dewanganj, a village in West Bengal, India

Elsewhere 
 Bali, Greece, a village on the island of Crete, Greece
 770 Bali, an asteroid

Biology
 Anelosimus bali, a species of spider found in Bali
 Bali myna, a species of bird in the family Sturnidae
 Bali pony, an ancient pony breed currently living in Bali, Indonesia
 Vepris bali, a species of plant in the family Rutaceae

Businesses 
 Bali (lingerie), an American lingerie company
 Bali Air, an inactive airline based in Jakarta, Indonesia
 Bali TV, a privately owned television station covering the island of Bali
 Gran Hotel Bali, a skyscraper in Benidorm, Spain

Media 
 Bali (1970 film), an Italian film starring Laura Antonelli
 Bali (2021 film), an Indian Marathi language horror film
 Bali (TV series), a 2005–2006 French-Canadian animated television series
 "Bali", a song by 88Glam from the mixtape 88Glam

People

Kings and mythological figures
 Bali (Chandravanshi), a ruler of Bharatkhand in the Mahabharata
 Vali (Ramayana) (also spelled Bali), a Vanara king from the epic Ramayana
 Mahabali, a Shaiva asura who surrendered his kingdom to Vamana
 Mahabali (disambiguation), several characters
 Simuka, or Bali, a king of the Satavahana dynasty
 Bali, or Baliraj, a 15th-century king of the Kallala dynasty of Nepal
 Baliraja, a 9th-century king of the Licchavi kingdom
 Baliraja, a 10th-century king of the Chahamanas of Naddula

Other people
 Bali (name), an Indian name (including a list of persons with the name)
 Turan G. Bali, American economist

Religion 

 Bali, or Bajrang Bali, another name of the god Hanuman
 Vali (Ramayana), Vanara king in Hindu epic Ramayana
 Bali (sacrifice), a ritual sacrifice including animals
 Torma, Tibetan term for Buddhist offering cakes, called bali or balingha in Sanskrit

Other uses 
 Bali language (disambiguation), which may refer to any of several languages
Bali (tribe), an Arab tribe with branches in Saudi Arabia, Jordan, Egypt and Sudan
 Short for balisong knife, a type of folding knife
 Bali United F.C., an association football club in Bali
 USS Bali (ID-2483), a Dutch freighter seized in World War I

See also
 Balli (disambiguation)